William R. Johnson (sometimes referred to as Bill Johnson) was the first openly gay minister to be ordained in a historic protestant denomination. He received his ordination through the United Church of Christ (UCC) on June 25, 1972 in San Carlos, California.

Education and ordination 
Johnson first received his undergraduate degree in May 1968 from Elmhurst College (now University) with a BA in English. He then held two summer student pastoral positions in Iowa before beginning his seminary in the following fall at Pacific School of Religion in Berkeley, California. He attended seminary from 1968–1971 and during that time he also held church positions as a youth minister, student pastor, chaplain, and Interim Associate Pastor. 

In 1970, The Graduate Theological Union organized a support group in Berkeley for gay seminarians. Johnson, having recently embraced his identity as a gay man that year, became an active member of the group. That year the group hosted a public forum at Graduate Theological Union on the topic of homosexuality and the church. The event drew in around 400 attendees. During the public forum, Johnson came out as a gay Christian and made clear his intentions of receiving an ordination through the United Church of Christ. As a requirement for ordination, Johnson worked as a coordinator for a house church development ministry within the United Church of Christ from January 1971 until his ordination in San Carlos on June 25, 1972. He later returned to school to receive his Doctor of Education degree at the Institute for Advance Study of Human Sexuality in San Francisco in May 1977. His ordination is the subject of the documentary film "A Position of Faith" directed by Michael Rhodes.

Career as a minister and LGBT activist 

Some of Johnson's accomplishments in LGBT activism include founding the UCC Gay Caucus (now called UCC Coalition for LGBT Concerns) and co-founding P-FLAG/San Francisco. He has also planted UCC churches in New York and Ohio. An annual lecture at Elmhurst University called The William R. Johnson Intercultural Lecture was named after him, along with The William R. Johnson Scholarship which was set up in 1999 for gay, lesbian, bisexual, and transgender United Church of Christ seminarians. In 1974 Johnson co-authored the book Loving Women/Loving Men: Gay Liberation and the Church with Sally Miller Gearhart. After moving to New York City in 1977, Johnson founded Maranatha: Riversiders for Lesbian/Gay Concerns at Riverside Church the following year which was the first parish-based LGBT ministry within the United Church of Christ.

Retirement 
Johnson retired during the 29th United Church of Christ General Synod on July 1, 2013. In his retirement, he continues to give talks about his experiences as a  gay Christian activist and minister.

See also 
List of Christian denominations affirming LGBT
List of Christian denominational positions on homosexuality

References 

LGBT Protestant clergy
1946 births
United Church of Christ ministers
Elmhurst College alumni
Pacific School of Religion alumni
People from Houston
People from Manhattan
Living people